JS Kurobe (ATS-4202) is a training support ship of Japan Maritime Self-Defense Force.

Development and design 
It is a ship for anti-aircraft shooting training support, and its main purpose is to launch and guide unmanned target aircraft. It was built as a complement to the air threat, higher performance of air defense weapons, and the obsolescence of the predecessor training ship .

It is a flat deck type ship type, equipped with one  single gun on the front deck. The target aircraft will be equipped with four BMQ-34AJ Firebee and four BQM-74E Chaka III, for a total of eight. These target aircraft are launched from the rear helipad, and up to three aircraft can be simultaneously guided and controlled by a four-sided phased array radar on the top of the ship's structure. A radar for evaluating shooting results is also installed separately.

Construction and career
Kurobe was laid down on 31 October 1987 at JFE Holdings, Kure and launched on 23 May 1988. The ship was commissioned on 23 March 1989.

In September 1990, a female Self-Defense Forces officer (correspondent, Naoko Matsuo, 3rd Lieutenant) became the first ship of the Maritime Self-Defense Force to be on board. On June 24, 1994, Kurobe was reorganized into the escort fleet as a ship under direct control.

In response to the Great East Japan Earthquake off the Pacific coast of Tohoku Earthquake, the vessel departed for the disaster area, Onagawa Town, Miyagi Prefecture, to aid in disaster relief.

Gallery

References

1988 ships
Ships built in Japan
Training ships of the Japan Maritime Self-Defense Force